Universiti Sultan Zainal Abidin (abbreviated as  UniSZA; Jawi: اونيۏرسيتي سلطان زين العابدين)  is the 18th public institution of higher learning, located in the state of Terengganu, Malaysia. The university is a creature of the Act of Parliament known as the Universities and University Colleges Act 1971, with its constitution laid down under the Universities and University Colleges (Variation of, and Addition to, the Constitution)(Universiti Sultan Zainal
Abidin) Order 2010. It is the first full-fledged university in the east coast of Peninsular Malaysia and the first university to be based on the “cluster” concept. It is also the first university in Malaysia to be modelled after University of London, United Kingdom.

The university has four campuses namely Gong Badak Campus, Medical Campus at Kuala Terengganu and Besut Campus at Tembila,Besut. The university has 12 faculties located in different campuses which offer programs in foundation, diploma, bachelor's and master's level as well as doctor of philosophy.

The university is considered the biggest "comprehensive university" in the east coast of Peninsular Malaysia and to be one of the most respected Islamic-based institution of higher learning in Malaysia. It has produced thousands of graduates in various fields, since its establishment in 1980.

History

The university was first established as an Islamic educational college known as Kolej Ugama Sultan Zainal Abidin (abbreviation KUSZA; Jawi: كوليج أڬام سلطان زين العابدين) on 27 January 1980, under the administration of the Terengganu Religious Affairs Department. KUSZA was made a statutory body with the passing of the Enactment 31/1981 by the Terengganu State Legislative Assembly. A permanent campus was built on a  site in Gong Badak, Kuala Nerus, Kuala Terengganu and KUSZA began operating in the campus from January 1983. The first program to be offered was a Diploma in Islamic Studies (Syariah). This has expanded to 23 Diploma programs and three Advanced Diploma programs.

Establishment of the university

On 26 March 2005, KUSZA was upgraded into a full-fledged university known as Universiti Darul Iman Malaysia (abbreviation UDM;) and the number of programs and disciplines were extended. It began when Prime Minister Dato’ Seri Abdullah Haji Ahmad Badawi announced the formation of a new university to be established in the state of Terengganu, Malaysia. This was followed by the appointment of the first Vice-Chancellor, Alias bin Daud, on 1 January 2006.

Present form

With the approval from Yang di-Pertuan Agong, Sultan Mizan Zainal Abidin on 13 April 2010, the Universiti Darul Iman Malaysia is now known as Universiti Sultan Zainal Abidin effective on 14 May 2010 after the government gazette of Universiti Darul Iman Malaysia (Incorporation) (Amendment) Order 2010 came into force on 13 May 2010. The Higher Education Minister, Datuk Seri Mohamed Khaled Nordin said in the press statement that the change of name was made after taking into account the historical background of the institution.

Campuses

The university operates with two campuses in the city of Kuala Terengganu which are the Medical Campus and the Gong Badak Campus and another campus in Besut (Besut Campus).The Gong Badak Campus focuses on the teaching and research of Islamic knowledge and its harmonisation with other professional courses such as Accountancy, Law, Language, Design and Technology, Social Sciences, and Health Sciences. While the Medical Campus offers Medical and Nursing programs. The Besut Campus was developed with a niche in Biotechnology, Bioresources, Food Industry, IT and Computering. These campuses will have their own specialised field of studies, each with a separate and identifiable niche.

Admission policies
As a public university, the student intakes are usually handled by the government centralised system called Unit Pengambilan Universiti (UPU) (University Intake Unit) under the administration of Department of Higher Education, Ministry of Higher Education. Thus, intakes for bachelor's degrees are opened for students who hold Sijil Tinggi Pelajaran Malaysia (Malaysian Higher School Certificate), matriculation programmes and diploma/certificates from recognised polytechnic schools.

Intakes for diploma programmes are open to students who hold Sijil Pelajaran Malaysia (Malaysian Certificate of Education) or Sijil Pelajaran Malaysia (Vokasional) (Malaysian Vocational Education Certificate) or certificates from technical/vocational schools.

Education
The university has a semester-based modular system for conducting courses. It adopts features of the British system, such as small group teaching (tutorials) and the American system (course credits). One academic year is divided into two normal/long semesters which are Semester I and Semester II. In addition to these two semesters, there is also a short/special semester called Semester III which is conducted during semester break.

Research
The Centre for Research Management and Innovation is responsible to oversee all research made by the members of the university.

Faculties and programmes

Presently, there are 18 bachelor's degree programs and 23 diploma programs. Programmes offered at the university are in diverse fields of study: law, international relations, languages and communication, informatics, business management, accountancy, medicine, health sciences, agriculture, biotechnology, food technology, innovative design and technology, social sciences and Islamic studies.

The university offers multiple undergraduate and postgraduate programs in 12 faculties located at the Gong Badak Campus (formerly known as KUSZA Campus), Medical Campus (formerly known as Kota Campus) and Tembila Campus:

Gong Badak Campus
 Status: Main campus
 Location: Gong Badak, Kuala Terengganu
 Specializations: Management and Contemporary

List of Faculties:
 Faculty of Contemporary Islamic Studies
 Faculty of Business Management and Accountancy
 Faculty of Law and International Relations
 Faculty of Innovative Design and Technology
 Faculty of Languages and Communications
 Faculty of Applied Social Sciences
 Faculty of Health Sciences

City Campus
 Status: Branch campus
 Location: Batu Buruk, Kuala Terengganu
 Specialization: Medical and Health Sciences
List of Faculties:
 Faculty of Medicine & Health

Besut Campus
 Status: Branch campus
 Location: Taman Ilmu Terengganu, Tembila, Besut
 Specialization: Science and Technology
List of Faculties:
 Faculty of Bioresources and Food Industry
 Faculty of Informatics and Computering
 Faculty of Pharmacy

Campus facilities and resources

Student accommodation
Three of the residential colleges are located at the Gong Badak Campus, while another two is located at the each Medical Campus and Tembila Campus respectively. There are 38 building blocks with a total of 2379 rooms at the Gong Badak Campus while there are two building blocks with 44 rooms at the Medical Campus. In Tembila Campus, the residential college is a shared facility with another college. On average, each room can accommodate two students. Overall, these five residential colleges can accommodate approximately 4,800 students. At each of this residential college, cafeteria facilities are also provided.

Sports and recreation
The university has a multi-purpose gymnasium for sports such as badminton, squash and volleyball. Facilities for other main sports include a hockey field, tennis courts, sepak takraw courts and archery fields.

Universiti Sultan Zainal Abidin Library
The Universiti Sultan Zainal Abidin Library was established in 1980 when the first batch of students officially enrolled at the temporary campus in Sekolah Menengah Agama (ATAS) Sultan Zainal Abidin in Batu Buruk, Kuala Terengganu when UniSZA was first established as KUSZA. In 1984, the library has moved into the permanent Gong Badak campus and was placed at a ground floor of a three-storey building. The construction of the current library building, known as Perpustakaan Al-Mukhtar was completed in the middle of 1987. The library launched its operation in 2007 for the Medical Campus to provide information services and library services for all students and staff of Kota Campus. In conjunction with the operation of a new additional campus in Tembila Besut, the library also initiated its operation in September 2013. This branch will provide services for students, faculty members and all staffs of that campus.

Universiti Sultan Zainal Abidin Mosque
The university has a picturesque mosque that can accommodate approximately 3,500 worshippers at any one time. Many religious activities are regularly conducted by the Islamic Centre here.

Finances
As a full public university, its financial resources originate mostly from the federal government. Under the Ninth Malaysia Plan (Malay: Rancangan Malaysia ke-9), the university has been granted RM 417 million (US$137 million) to be spent from 2006 to 2010. While under the Tenth Malaysia Plan (Malay: Rancangan Malaysia ke-10), the university has received RM 420 million (US$138 million) to be spent between 2011 and 2015.

An additional RM 2.2 million (US$721 000) in form of research grant was granted by Terengganu state government to the university in April 2009 to be used for researching the Asiatic bitter yam or Intoxicating yam (Botanical name: Dioscorea hispida Dennst). This toxic plant is an important source of secondary food for the local people, especially in times of food scarcity. It is also used in local pharmaceutical industry and medicine.

International co-operation
In January 2012, the university has signed a memorandum of understanding (MoU) with Prince of Songkla University (Thailand) to promote academics co-operation in the fields of humanities and social sciences.

In 2011, the university has signed a memorandum of understanding (MoU) with the McGill University, Canada and agreed on the planning and development of an advanced modern teaching hospital and telemedicine facilities in Malaysia.

In April 2011, the Faculty of Business Management and Accountancy, UniSZA in collaboration with the Centre for Research Management and Innovation, UniSZA has organised International Conference on Business Management 2011. The participants for this conference were drawn from various countries. Among the main topics that have been discussed in the conference were 'Business Management, Human Resource and Marketing', 'Accounting', 'Economics, Finance and Banking' as well as 'Risk Management and Corporate Governance'.

In July 2010, the university has signed a memorandum of understanding with the International Centre for Education in Islamic Finance. This co-operation has enabled the university to offer the programmes of Chartered Islamic Finance Professional (CIFP) at the Faculty of Business Management and Accountancy, UniSZA.

In October 2010, the university conducted discussions with the delegation from Universiti Islam Sultan Sharif Ali (Brunei Darussalam) at the Gong Badak campus regarding future academics co-operation with the Faculty of Contemporary Islamic Studies, UniSZA. This was then followed by another visit by Universiti Islam Sultan Sharif Ali's representatives to the university in December 2011 and a memorandum of understanding between both universities has been signed.

The university had been offering the Bachelor of Science (Honours) in Business Information Systems, Business Administration, Finance dan Accounting in partnership with the University of East London since 2001.

Recognition and achievement
In May 2012, a postgraduate student from Faculty of Health Sciences, UniSZA won silver medal in the International Invention, Innovation And Technology Exhibition (ITEX 2012) held at Kuala Lumpur Convention Centre. The research innovation entitled 'Mobile Epilepsy Educational System (MEES) For People With Epilepsy In Malaysia' was chosen to receive the award under the Education category.

In March 2012, the team of two students from Faculty of Law and International Relations, UniSZA emerged as champion in the Harun M Hashim National Client Consultation Competition 2012 held at Universiti Sains Islam Malaysia. The team won against other teams from University of Malaya, International Islamic University Malaysia, National University of Malaysia, Universiti Utara Malaysia, and the host team Universiti Sains Islam Malaysia. The team then went on to represent Malaysia in the prestigious Louis M Brown and Forrest S Morten International Client Consultation Competition held in Dublin, Ireland in April 2012.

In 2011, the team of two students from Faculty of Innovative Design and Technology, UniSZA won the main prize in the NST-Peugeot Car Design Competition 2011. This winning has earned them an all expenses paid five-day-four-night trip to Paris and visit to Peugeot's research and design centre in Velinzy, France.

In April 2011, the team of four students from Faculty of Bioresources and Food Industry, UniSZA emerged as champion in the National Environmental Quiz held at Universiti Pendidikan Sultan Idris. The team has beaten Universiti Teknologi MARA in the final round and brought home RM 1000 (US$327) and a trophy.

In August 2011, the team of three students from Faculty of Law and International Relations, UniSZA won the 'Outstanding Achievement Memorial Award' in the Asia Cup International Law Moot Court Competition 2011 held in Tokyo, Japan. UniSZA was the first university in Malaysia to have received the prestigious award since 1999, the year when the competition was founded. The UniSZA team who also received sponsorship by the Japan Ministry of Foreign Affairs, has to compete with 10 other Asian universities for the award such as Kyoto University, Waseda University, University of Hong Kong, Diplomatic Academy of Vietnam, Ateneo de Manila University, Thammasat University, Singapore Management University, Atma Jaya Catholic University and Universitas Pelita Harapan

In November 2011, the Law Students' Society from Faculty of Law and International Relations, UniSZA has successfully organised the Asian Law Students' Association (ALSA) National Forum 2011 at UniSZA's Gong Badak Campus, after winning the bid against Universiti Teknologi MARA for the right to organise the event which was held in Kuala Lumpur. With the theme entitled 'Criminal Law: The Beat Within', it has drawn participation from various law schools in Malaysia, namely Universiti Kebangsaan Malaysia, International Islamic University Malaysia, University of Malaya, Universiti Teknologi MARA, Universiti Utara Malaysia, Universiti Sains Islam Malaysia, Multimedia University and Help University College. Among the prominent persons who attended the program include the former Chief Justice of Malaysia, Tun Zaki Tun Azmi and the Head of International Committee of Red Cross (ICRC) for Asia region, Mr. Richard Desgagné.

See also
 List of universities in Malaysia

Gallery

References

External links

 Universiti Sultan Zainal Abidin official website

Kuala Nerus District
Universities and colleges in Terengganu
Public universities in Malaysia
Islamic universities and colleges in Malaysia
Educational institutions established in 1980
Law schools in Malaysia
1980 establishments in Malaysia